Nadir El Fassi (born 23 September 1983 in Perpignan) is a French decathlete.

Achievements

References
 

1983 births
Living people
French decathletes
Sportspeople from Perpignan
Universiade medalists in athletics (track and field)
Universiade bronze medalists for France
Medalists at the 2005 Summer Universiade